People who served as the mayor of the Municipality of Paddington are:

References

Mayors Paddington
Paddington, Mayors
Mayors of Paddington